Harry Lumley may refer to:

Harry Lumley (baseball) (1880–1938), right fielder and manager in Major League Baseball
Harry Lumley (ice hockey) (1926–1998), ice hockey goaltender

See also
Henry Lumley (disambiguation)